Claire Minna Patricia Olofsdotter Wikholm (born 10 October 1944 in Stockholm) is a Swedish actress.

Wikholm worked at Malmö City Theatre 1968–71 and since then, she has worked at Stockholm City Theatre.

In November 2005, it was revealed that Wikholm has emphysema after smoking for many years. She participated in season ten of Stjärnorna på slottet in December and January 2015-16, broadcast on SVT.

Selected filmography
1969 – Som natt och dag
1971 – Broster, Broster! (TV, "Julkalendern")
1973 – Bröllopet
1975 – A Guy and a Gal
1979 – Gå på vattnet om du kan
1979 – I Am Maria
1980 – Vi hade i alla fall tur med vädret
1982 – Gräsänklingar
1983 – Henrietta
1986 – Hassel – Beskyddarna
1992 – Luciafesten (TV)
1995 – Pensionat Oskar
2002 – Bella – bland kryddor och kriminella (TV)
2006 – Cars (Swedish title Bilar)
2007 – Allt om min buske
2008 – Vi hade i alla fall tur med vädret – igen
2008 – Everlasting Moments

References

External links
Claire Wikholm on Stockholm City Theatre's website

Actresses from Stockholm
Living people
1944 births
Swedish actresses